Ray Rapp is a  former Democratic member of the North Carolina General Assembly representing the state's one hundred eighteenth House district, including constituents in Haywood, Madison and Yancey counties. He served as Minority Whip. A college administrator from Mars Hill, North Carolina, Rapp servered four terms in the state House.  Rapp is a former Mayor of the town of Mars Hill.

References

Project Vote Smart bio page

External links

Democratic Party members of the North Carolina House of Representatives
1945 births
Living people
21st-century American politicians
People from Mars Hill, North Carolina